"Touch It" is the lead single from American R&B singer Monifah's second album, Mo'hogany. The song was produced and written by Jack Knight and Screwface. It uses a sample of Laid Back's 1983 hit "White Horse", so songwriters Tim Stahl and John Guldberg are given writing credits.

Released as a single on July 21, 1998, the song became a worldwide hit, charting within the top 20 in Australia, Belgium, and Canada. In the United States, it peaked at number nine on both the Billboard Hot 100 and on the Billboard Hot R&B Singles chart. "Touch It" is Monifah's highest-peaking song on the US charts, though it did not receive a gold certification like her 1996 hit "You", and was ranked number 77 on the Billboard Year-End Hot 100 singles of 1998. The song's music video features Monifah performing the song in front of the United States Armed Forces.

Track listings

US CD and cassette single, Australian CD single
 "Touch It" (radio edit)
 "Touch It" (album version)
 "Suga Suga" (snippet)
 "Fallin' in Love" (snippet)
 "Better Half of Me" (snippet)

US 12-inch single
 "Touch It" (LP version) — 4:46
 "Touch It" (clean LP version) — 4:47
 "Touch It" (instrumental) — 4:35

UK CD and 12-inch single
 "Touch It" (clean radio edit)
 "Touch It" (Clark Kent remix)
 "Touch It" (Ignorants remix)
 "Touch It" (Maurice Joshua main edit)

UK cassette single and European CD single
 "Touch It" (clean radio edit)
 "Touch It" (Clark Kent remix)

Charts

Weekly charts

Year-end charts

Certifications

Release history

Cover versions and samples
 2001: Mytown sampled the lyrics referencing Jack Knight and Dakoda House in "Party All Night" from their self-titled album
 2003: Dannii Minogue sampled the song and the 1983 original "White Horse" by Laid Back on the track "Push" from the album Neon Nights
 2014: Nena Buddemeier (ft. DJ Tomekk)

References

Monifah songs
1998 singles
1998 songs
Uptown Records singles
Universal Records singles